is a Sega Mega Drive war-related video game that takes place in the late 25th century. The game was developed by Masaya Games, published by Nihon Computer System, and released on October 23, 1992. The release-date retail price was 8,880 Japanese yen.
An English-translated production run was scheduled for 2019 by Super Fighter Team with a price of $63 (for US customers) or $70 (for the rest of the world), but it was ultimately cancelled.

Summary
In the year 2396, the nation of Merisma Harp completed development of the newest and most advanced line of combat operations robots: VECTORs. Intended to protect planet Earth from alien invaders, these powerful weapons were entrusted to Takuya Murasawa's Slash Team for field testing.

But when Merisma Harp's military installations suddenly came under attack by another nation, Slash Team was called to the front lines of battle. This young, fresh-faced group must now put the unproven VECTORs to the ultimate test in a rush to unmask and defeat the enemy.

Many of the characters that are provided to the player provide character development and losing them could mean losing the game, resulting in a game over. The game uses a battery save to help players regain lost characters in case one of them die in a tactical mistake.

Anime-style cinemas help improve the plot as the story develops.

Notes

References

External links 
 Vixen 357 at GameFAQs
 Vixen 357 at MobyGames

1992 video games
Japan-exclusive video games
Masaya Games games
Sega Genesis-only games
Sega Genesis games
Video games developed in Japan
Single-player video games